The Territory of Sagadahock, also called the Sagadahoc Colony and New Castle, was an English colonial territory which included the eastern part of what was later colonial Maine and was more sparsely settled than the western region. The area included was east of the Kennebec River.

On some accounts, the English first settled Sagadahoc in 1608–09.  
 
A part of the grant of King Charles II in 1664 to his brother the Duke of York included the territory between the St Croix and Pemaquid and northward, variously called the "Sagadahoc Territory" and "New Castle". 
 
The area was later absorbed into the Province of Maine. In 1691, a new charter of Massachusetts was granted by William III and Mary II and included the Province of Maine, the "territory of Sagadahoc", and also Nova Scotia.

Notes

Pre-statehood history of Maine
History of the Thirteen Colonies
Former English colonies
Colonial settlements in North America
1664 establishments in the Thirteen Colonies